The 2009 South Korean Figure Skating Championships were the South Korean Figure Skating Championships for the 2008–09 season. They were the 63rd edition of those championships held. They were organized by the Korean Skating Union.

Skaters competed in the disciplines of men's and ladies singles on the senior, junior, and novice levels for the title of national champion of South Korea. The results of the national championships were used to choose the South Korean teams to the 2009 World Figure Skating Championships, the 2009 Four Continents Figure Skating Championships, and the 2009 World Junior Figure Skating Championships.

The 2009 Championships took place between January 9 and 10, 2009 in Goyang.

Competition notes
 The results of the competition were reported incorrectly to the International Skating Union. Despite being listed officially as the national champion, Kim Yuna did not compete.

Senior results

Men

Ladies

Junior results

Men

Ladies

Novice results

Boys

Girls

International team selections
Following the national championships, the teams to the World Championships, the World Junior Championships, and the Four Continents Championships were announced as follows.

World Championships

Four Continents team

World Junior Championships

External links
 Korean Skating Union: 63rd KSU National Championships results and protocols
 

South Korean Figure Skating Championships
South Korean Figure Skating Championships, 2009
Figure skating